Purley High School for Boys existed from 1914 to 1988. Originally located in Purley from 1914, in 1936 it relocated to Placehouse Lane, Old Coulsdon, London Borough of Croydon. The school was Purley County Grammar School from 1914 to 1969, becoming Purley Grammar School for Boys and then, in 1973, Purley High School for Boys after the abolition of the Grammar School system and the implementation of the Comprehensive System.

As Purley High School for Boys it was a senior secondary school, for students aged 14 to 18.

Purley High School had a reputation for strictness and for the frequent use of corporal punishment; records showing a peak in canings of 43.7 per 100 pupils in the year 1977/78. Its record on canings came to the attention of STOPP during the 1970s and 1980s. This was because STOPP happened to be based in Croydon at the time, and managed to get the Local Education Authority to publish an analysis of statistics collated from school punishment books, the first time this had happened in the UK. This resulted in Purley High School for Boys being mentioned in numerous articles in the national press regarding what was criticised as its excessive corporal punishment record. However, statistics for the use of corporal punishment later appeared from other areas of England and Wales, suggesting that Purley's caning record, compared with some other boys' secondary schools, was not quite as extraordinary as STOPP had originally claimed, once the fact that Purley was a 14–18 school (and therefore had about twice the proportion of 14- to 16-year-olds as an 11–18 school) was taken into account, 14–16 being almost invariably the peak age group for getting into trouble at school.

The school motto was Fas et Patria, meaning Faith and Country.  The Headmaster from 1968 to 1988 was Mr Derek Akers (Oxon).

After 52 years at the Placehouse Lane location, the school was closed in 1988, being replaced by Coulsdon Sixth Form College.

The 1930s Placehouse Lane school buildings were completely demolished during 2010–2011 and have been replaced by new college facilities.

Notable alumni
 Nigel Harman, actor
 Simon Jordan, businessman, former Chairman of Crystal Palace football club
 Jason Perry, politician, Mayor of Croydon

Purley County Grammar School
 Prof Stanley Bertram Chrimes, Professor of History at Cardiff University from 1953 to 1974
 Prof Martin L. Brown, Professor of Mathematics at the Institut Fourier, France since 1992 
 Peter Cushing, actor, horror movies
 Prof Gary Gibbons, Professor of Theoretical Physics since 1997 at the University of Cambridge
 Brian Hord CBE, Member of the European Parliament for London West from 1979 to 1984
 Gordon Pirie, multi world track record holder and silver medal winner at 5000m at the 1956 Melbourne Olympic Games

See also
 Coulsdon Sixth Form College, which now occupies the school site.

External links
 
Fas et Patria – Purley Boys School 1914–1988

References

Boys' schools in London
Educational institutions established in 1914
Educational institutions disestablished in 1988
Defunct schools in the London Borough of Croydon
1914 establishments in England
1988 disestablishments in England